Heideland-Elstertal-Schkölen (until January 2012: Heideland-Elstertal) is a Verwaltungsgemeinschaft ("collective municipality") in the district Saale-Holzland, in Thuringia, Germany. The seat of the Verwaltungsgemeinschaft is in Crossen an der Elster.

The Verwaltungsgemeinschaft Heideland-Elstertal-Schkölen consists of the following municipalities:
Crossen an der Elster
Hartmannsdorf 
Heideland 
Rauda 
Schkölen 
Silbitz 
Walpernhain

References

Verwaltungsgemeinschaften in Thuringia